Miss Bala  (Spanish for "Miss Bullet") is a 2011 Mexican action thriller film written by Gerardo Naranjo with Mauricio Katz and directed by Gerardo Naranjo. The film premiered in the Un Certain Regard section at the 2011 Cannes Film Festival. The film was selected as the Mexican entry for the Best Foreign Language Film at the 84th Academy Awards, but it did not make the final shortlist. An American remake was made in 2019.

Plot
23-year-old Laura Guerrero (Sigman) lives with her father Ramón (Javier Zaragoza) and little brother Arturo (Juan Carlos Galván). Laura and her friend Suzu (Lakshmi Picazo) both enter the competition for the Miss Baja beauty pageant. They go to the Millennium Night Club, where Suzu meets her boyfriend Javi (Hugo Márquez). However, when Laura goes into the bathroom, she witnesses members of the La Estrella gang causing chaos by shooting and killing a number of DEA officers and nightclub-goers. Frantic, she tries to search for Suzu, and as a result fails to show up for the early rehearsal for the pageant and is ejected from the competition.

She is then kidnapped by the leader of the La Estrella gang, Lino (Noé Hernández), and the gang also kidnap her brother and father as bargaining chips to control her. Laura is used by the gang for criminal missions, including transporting drug money across the US border, and luring out a DEA agent who has infiltrated the organization (José Yenque).

The climax of the film occurs after Laura wins the Miss Baja contest; she attempts to escape, but is recovered and later raped. The gang uses her to seduce a prominent military general (Miguel Courtrier); but she switches sides when she learns that Suzu had been a casualty in the nightclub shooting. She manages to survive the ensuing shoot-out, but is captured by the military, beaten, and paraded as a member of the gang. Laura is taken away by the police and dropped off at an undisclosed location.

Cast
 Stephanie Sigman as Laura Guerrero 
 Irene Azuela as Jessica Berlanga 
 Miguel Couturier as General Salomón Duarte 
 Gabriel Heads as Agent Bell 
 Noé Hernández as Lino Valdez 
 James Russo as Jimmy
 Lakshmi Picazo as Suzu
 José Yenque as Kike Cámara

Real life incident
Miss Bala is loosely based on a real incident, in which 2008's Miss Sinaloa, Laura Zúñiga, was arrested with suspected gang members in a truck filled with munitions outside Guadalajara, Jalisco. In an interview with Complex Magazine, director Gerardo Naranjo said that he had met Zúñiga, but that "I really didn’t want to go into their psyches. I guess the film has a very strong point-of-view, and we refuse to get into the minds of these guys, because I think that’s what every other movie does… I wanted to live the experience from the point-of-view of an innocent person."

Reception
On its release at the 2011 Cannes Film Festival, Miss Bala received praise from critics. On review aggregator Rotten Tomatoes, the film holds an approval rating of 87% based on 69 reviews, with an average rating of 7.2/10. The website's critical consensus reads, "Miss Balas subject is loaded enough, but the frantic and muscular filmmaking puts this movie in a whole new league." At Metacritic, which assigns a weighted mean rating to reviews, the film has an average score of 79 out of 100, based on 24 critics, indicating "generally favorable reviews".

Remake
In 2017, it was announced Catherine Hardwicke would direct a remake of the film, from a screenplay by Gareth Dunnet-Alcocer, starring Gina Rodriguez, Ismael Cruz Córdova, and Anthony Mackie. It was released on 1 February 2019, by Columbia Pictures.

See also
 List of submissions to the 84th Academy Awards for Best Foreign Language Film
 List of Mexican submissions for the Academy Award for Best Foreign Language Film

References

External links

2011 films
2011 action thriller films
2010s Spanish-language films
Mexican action thriller films
Action films based on actual events
Films about beauty pageants
Films about Mexican drug cartels
Films set in Tijuana
2010s Mexican films